The Danville metropolitan area may refer to:

The Danville, Illinois metropolitan area, United States
The Danville, Virginia micropolitan area, United States
The Danville, Kentucky micropolitan area, United States

See also
Danville (disambiguation)